Kerenzerberg Pass (el. 743 m.) is a mountain pass in the Alps in the canton of Glarus in Switzerland.

It connects Mollis and Mühlehorn above the Walensee.

The pass road was built in 1848 and has a maximum grade of 10 percent. Two tunnels have been dug under the pass, a road tunnel for the A-3 Autobahn and a rail tunnel for the Ziegelbrücke to Sargans railway line.

The area is known for both summer and winter sport.

See also
 List of highest paved roads in Europe
 List of mountain passes

Mountain passes of Switzerland
Mountain passes of the Alps
Mountain passes of the canton of Glarus